Dominic Francis Perrottet (born 21 September 1982) is an Australian politician who is currently serving as the 46th premier of New South Wales and leader of the New South Wales division of the Liberal Party of Australia. He assumed office on 5 October 2021 following the resignation of Gladys Berejiklian.

Perrottet previously served as treasurer of New South Wales and deputy leader of the New South Wales Liberal Party from January 2017 to October 2021, and is a member of the New South Wales Legislative Assembly representing the seat of Epping since the 2019 state election. He represented Castle Hill from 2011 to 2015 and Hawkesbury from 2015 to 2019. Perrottet served as Minister for Industrial Relations in the first Berejiklian ministry and as Minister for Finance, Services and Property in the first and second Baird ministries.

Early life and background
Perrottet was born in 1982, and raised in West Pennant Hills, Sydney. He is the third oldest of 12 children. His father, John Perrottet, works for the World Bank as the Global Lead for Tourism at the International Finance Corporation, in Washington, D.C. Perrottet's family were members of the Catholic prelature, Opus Dei.

Perrottet was educated at private schools Oakhill College in Castle Hill and Redfield College in Dural. Perrottet was active in student politics while studying commerce and law at the University of Sydney and campaigned for voluntary student unionism. He went on to work as a commercial lawyer for Henry Davis York in the areas of banking restructuring and insolvency law.

Perrottet was the President of the NSW Young Liberals Movement in 2005 and served on the NSW State Executive of the Liberal Party from 2008 to 2011.

Political career

Early career 

Following the resignation of sitting Liberal MP Michael Richardson, Perrottet won Liberal preselection for the very safe Liberal seat of Castle Hill in November 2010, with the backing of right-wing power broker David Clarke. Clarke battled against Alex Hawke, Federal Member for Mitchell, to gain control of preselections. At the 2011 state election, Perrottet was elected with a swing of 12.2 per cent, and won 80.8 per cent of the vote on a two-party-preferred basis.

With the resignation of Barry O'Farrell as Premier, and the subsequent ministerial reshuffle by Mike Baird, the new Liberal Leader, Perrottet was appointed as Minister for Finance and Services in April 2014.

Following a redistribution of electoral boundaries, Perrottet traded seats with fellow Liberal Ray Williams for the 2015 state election. Perrottet handed Castle Hill to Williams to run in Williams' equally safe seat of Hawkesbury. Perrottet was elected with 68 per cent of the two-party preferred vote.

After the resignation of Baird as Premier, the main factions of the NSW Liberals agreed to support his deputy, Gladys Berejiklian, as his successor, with Perrottet as her deputy. Berejiklian is from the party's moderate wing, while Perrottet is from the conservative wing. Accordingly, on 23 January 2017, Berejiklian and Perrottet were unanimously elected as leader and deputy leader of the NSW Liberal Party. Later that day, Berejiklian was sworn in as New South Wales' second female Premier. When Berejiklian reshuffled her ministry, Perrottet took over her former ministerial roles as Treasurer and Minister for Industrial Relations, with effect from 30 January 2017.

In the lead up to the 2019 state election, Perrottet attempted to wrest Castle Hill back from Williams, citing work-life balance as Hawkesbury was too far for him to travel. This was unsuccessful, with Williams retaining the Liberal preselection, and resulted in media reports of significant party infighting and Perrottet publicly apologising. Eventually, Perrottet abandoned the Hawkesbury preselection, and he settled on his second-choice, the equally safe seat of Epping. At the 2019 state election Perrottet was elected as Member for Epping and reappointed as Treasurer in the second Berejiklian ministry.

icare controversy 

Perrottet's record as NSW Treasurer was marred by allegations that his department mismanaged the state's workers compensation scheme, icare. A combined investigation by The Age, The Sydney Morning Herald and ABC TV's Four Corners found that icare had underpaid as many as 52,000 injured workers by up to $80 million and that the organisation was close to collapse. Following the investigation, NSW's workers' compensation regulator State Insurance Regulatory Authority (SIRA) announced in August 2020 that it would be applying increased scrutiny to icare's 2020 financial audit. icare was also accused of improperly handling private sector contracts. The Information and Privacy Commission NSW found that icare had not publicly registered 422 contracts since 2015, each worth more than $150,000. These contracts include some being awarded without a competitive tender to companies associated with Liberal Party figures, such as marketing firm IVE Group being awarded millions of dollars in contracts. IVE Group is run by former NSW Liberal party president Geoff Selig.

An internal note among senior figures in the NSW Treasury in 2018 raised a concern that "a direct line to [Perrottet] means icare often bypasses Treasury". The Sydney Morning Herald reported on the note in 2020 and noted that other concerns raised included icare's non-compliance with recruitment policies and limited disclosures of capital expenditures. Scrutiny of Perrottet's close relationship with icare prompted him to direct Treasury Secretary Michael Pratt to audit the Treasurer's staffing arrangements, which the NSW Labor Party criticised as a "sham" as the Secretary was a former deputy chairman of icare.

In April 2021, NSW Parliament's Law and Justice Committee tabled its 2020 review of the Workers' Compensation Scheme. The report highlighted the deteriorating financial position of the scheme, a fall in return to work rates and an increase in claim costs, including medical expenses. The committee's chairman said "icare's decision and ambitious approach to implementing a new claims management model has also played a role, to the detriment of injured workers and the public". A statutory review by the NSW Government was released on the same day, with the reviewer the Hon Robert McDougall QC saying execution of the program was "sloppy" and "the result of these shortcomings was that procurements for the [Nominal Insurer] — often involving very large sums of money — were conducted on an opaque basis".

COVID-19 pandemic 
Perrottet advocated strongly for business activity in the face of lockdowns and advice from health officials. During the northern beaches lockdown at the end of 2020, he suggested that the state's Chief Health Officer, Kerry Chant, take a pay cut if Sydney or its suburbs were unnecessarily locked down. Perrottet also pushed the federal government to reinstate JobKeeper payments for Sydney residents in July 2021 as a new wave of infections was beginning.

As Treasurer, Perrottet has been one of the architects of the JobSaver program and has overseen micro business support payments, payroll tax waivers and deferrals, vouchers for spending in CBD businesses and other support for businesses affected by the epidemic.

Perrottet opposed his cabinet colleagues and the advice of NSW Health when they extended a COVID lockdown on 7 July 2021.

In early October 2021, after becoming Premier, Perrottet unveiled an accelerated roadmap out of lockdown with some key changes to attendance limits at indoor and outdoor gatherings. The changes were not endorsed by the NSW Chief Health Officer, who had warned that the changes came with increased risks but that it was ultimately a decision for the government.

Premier of New South Wales (2021–present)

On 3 October 2021, following the resignation of Premier Gladys Berejiklian, Perrottet was nominated to run as NSW Liberal Party leader, with Stuart Ayres, the Minister for Jobs, Investment, Tourism and Western Sydney, as his deputy. Having struck a deal with party powerbrokers, he was elected leader by the Liberal party room when it met on 5 October, and was sworn in as premier later that day. At 39 years of age, Perrottet became the youngest premier in New South Wales history, surpassing the previous record held by Nathan Rees, who was 40 when he first took office.

In April 2022, his government passed an anti-protest law, which was criticised by human rights groups as being repressive and anti-democratic. The new law would see protesters who block rail, ports and roads jailed for 2 years and fined 22,000 dollars for "disruption."

In June 2022, the Perrottet government announced plans to fly the Aboriginal flag on the Sydney Harbour Bridge, at the cost of 25 million dollars. This was seen as a hypocritical move by some, as in 2018 he lashed out at the same proposal by then-Opposition Leader Luke Foley, branding the proposal as 'virtue signaling.'

In late June 2022, controversy arose following the appointment of former Deputy Premier John Barilaro to a lucrative trade role. Controversy focused over the allegations that the appointment and selection process was interfered with and adjusted in favour of Barilaro, with specific focus placed on Trade Minister and deputy Liberal leader Stuart Ayres, with Investment NSW boss Amy Brown stating that he was "not at arms length from the process." Ayres resigned as a result from the fallout in early August 2022, being replaced as deputy Liberal leader by Treasurer Matt Kean. Controversy also came from Perrottet's perceived poor handling of the situation, reports that he told Barilaro to "go for it", and allegations that he promised Transport Minister David Elliott a job outside of politics, some reports stating that he was offered the position of Governor.

In late July 2022, further controversy emerged over allegations of bullying and mistreatment of staff by then-Fair Trading Minister Eleni Petinos, resulting in her sacking from the cabinet. Soon after, the resignation letter of the then-NSW Building Commissioner was released, blaming relations with Petinos for his decision. Allegations were also raised of potential interference between Petinos and removals of stop work orders placed on development company Coronation Property, a company employing Barilaro and implicated with links to gangs.

Towards the end of September, opinion polls showed significant drops in popularity with Labor establishing a substantial lead over the Coalition, drops widely linked with the fallout from the controversies.

Perrottet has announced plans to introduce a cashless gaming card for pokie machines in clubs and pubs in NSW, but a transition period where non-metropolitan pokies may be excluded from the pilot program has been discussed.

Nazi uniform scandal 
On 12 January 2023, Perrottet revealed that he had worn a Nazi uniform as fancy dress at his 21st birthday, apologising at a media conference after a cabinet minister was made aware of the incident. Rumours circulated that a photo of Perrottet and the uniform had been uncovered, but Perrottet denied any knowledge of the photograph and stated that his parents explained to him why the costume was inappropriate the day after the party. Transport Minister David Elliott stated that he had warned Perrottet about his political opponents knowing that he had worn the uniform and one of them was conspiring to use it against him.

A poll found that 67% said the Nazi uniform scandal, won't make a difference to their vote, 20% said it would make then less likely to vote for the Liberal coalition and 8% said the scandal would make them more likely.  

The Shooters, Fishers and Farmers Party will refer Perrottet to the NSW Police Force regarding whether Perrottet disclosed wearing a Nazi uniform as fancy dress at his 21st birthday as part of his preselection bid. At the time, Perrottet declared he had nothing to disclose that could embarrass the Liberal Party. Robert Borsak, the leader of the Shooters, Fishers and Farmers party, argues that this potentially breaks the Oaths Act, which is punishable by up to 5 years in jail.

Political positions 

Perrottet is the leader of the National Right or right-wing faction of the NSW Liberal Party. Previously backed to be Premier of NSW by conservative former Prime Minister John Howard, Perrottet was described by the Australian Financial Review as the "great hope in Australia for political conservatives". Perrottet is a conservative Catholic; he voted against decriminalising abortion in 2019 and voluntary euthanasia legislation in 2021.

In his maiden speech to New South Wales Parliament in 2011 he stated a belief in "exercising freedom [so] that individuals can develop the habits of generosity, hard work, fairness and concern for others". He also stated that traditionalism and libertarianism are both "vital and necessary strands of the fabric of conservative thought" and that the Liberal Party should embrace both. He stated opposition to "more social engineering, more welfare handouts... more government spending and intervention in our lives".

Personal life
Perrottet is married to Helen and has seven children.

Perrottet is a Catholic. He plays basketball.

See also

Baird ministry (2014–2015)
Baird ministry (2015–2017)
Berejiklian ministry (2017–2019)
Berejiklian ministry (2019–2021)
Second Perrottet ministry

References
Notes

Citations

Liberal Party of Australia members of the Parliament of New South Wales
Members of the New South Wales Legislative Assembly
Australian Roman Catholics
Living people
University of Sydney alumni
21st-century Australian politicians
Treasurers of New South Wales
1982 births
Australian monarchists
Premiers of New South Wales
People educated at Oakhill College